Jammu district is the most populous of the  districts in Jammu and Kashmir and is home to the winter capital (Jammu) of Jammu and Kashmir. The capital moves to Srinagar in the summer.

Administrative divisions

Jammu District has 7 Sub-Divisions:
 Jammu South
 Jammu North
 R.S. Pura
 Marh
 Akhnoor
 Chowki Choura
 Khour

There are 21 tehsils:
 Akhnoor
 Arnia
 Bahu
 Bhalwal
 Bishnah
 Chowki Choura
 Dansal
 Jammu
 Jammu North
 Jammu South
 Jammu West
 Jourian
 Kharah Balli
 Khour
 Maira Mandrian
 Mandal
 Marh
 Nagrota
 Pargwal
 Ranbir Singh Pura
 Suchetgarh
There are 20 Blocks:
 Akhnoor
 Arnia
 Bhalwal
 Bhalwal Brahmana
 Bishnah
 Chowki Choura
 Dansal
 Khour
 Kharah Balli
 Maira Mandrian
 Mandal
 Marh
 Mathwar
 Miran Sahib
 Nagrota
 Pargwal
 R.S. Pura
 Samwan
 Satwari
 Suchetgarh

Demographics

According to the 2011 census Jammu district has a population of 1,526,406, roughly equal to the nation of Gabon or the US state of Hawaii. This gives it a ranking of 326th in India (out of a total of 640). Its population growth rate over the decade 2001-2011 was 12.48%.Jammu has a sex ratio of 871 females for every 1000 males, and a literacy rate of 83.98%.

Languages

The most widely spoken language of Jammu is Dogri. Other languages spoken are Punjabi, Urdu, Hindi, Kashmiri, Gojri and English.

References

External links
 Official website of district administration

 
Districts of Jammu and Kashmir